The Book of Lies, is the first fantasy novel by Australian novelist James Moloney, who has written more than thirty books, most of them realistic fiction for children. Published in 2004, the fantasy novel is set in a land known as Elster and tells of the story of the main character, Marcel, after he wakes up in a foundling home with no memory of who he is. His struggle to reclaim his identity, along with close allies Nicola, Bea and Fergus, centres on uncovering the truth from amid a sea of lies, where few people are what they claim to be.

The Book of Lies was listed as notable in the Younger Readers category of the 2005 Children's Book Council of Australia Awards, and was the winner in its category at the 2005 APA Book Design Awards.

Book two, titled Master of the Books, was released on 1 June 2007 and a third and final novel concluding the series was released on 1 June 2009, called The Book from Baden Dark.

Plot
A 12-year-old boy wakes up in an orphanage one night with no memory of who he is. The only thing he remembers is his name, Robert.

But Robert is not his name, and a little girl called Bea knows this. She was there when Lord Alwyn, a once powerful sorcerer, erased all of his memory using the powerful Book of Lies.

He meets Bea, who tells of his name. His real name is Marcel. He encounters the mighty Fergus and the haughty Nicola during his stay at the orphanage, both of whose memories are nothing more than lies.

One day a mysterious man called Starkey claims to know the real lives of Nicola, Fergus and Marcel.

Upon meeting his mother, imprisoned by the evil usurper King Pelham, he suddenly is not sure. Is Starkey all that he claims to be? Is his mother his real mother? Is King Pelham really evil, or was that a lie as well? Danger lurks at every corner, and Marcel must stop the most feared Mortregis, beast of war, from rising once again.

External links
HarperCollins page about the book

2004 Australian novels
2004 fantasy novels
Novels by James Moloney
Children's fantasy novels
Australian children's novels
Australian fantasy novels
HarperCollins books
2004 children's books